The High Commission of Pakistan in London is the diplomatic mission of Pakistan in the United Kingdom.

In September 2015, DAWN reported Prime Minister of Pakistan Nawaz Sharif constituted a four-member committee to explore the possibility of selling the High Commission building.

References

External links

 
 Official site

Pakistan
Diplomatic missions of Pakistan
Pakistan–United Kingdom relations
Buildings and structures in the Royal Borough of Kensington and Chelsea
Belgravia
Pakistan and the Commonwealth of Nations
United Kingdom and the Commonwealth of Nations